The Mosetse River is a natural watercourse in Botswana. Within the country of Botswana the Mosetse is a source of water to the ephemeral wetlands of the Makgadikgadi Pans, where a number of crustacean species of limited distribution thrive. More specifically the Mosetse River discharges to Sua Pan, draining parts of eastern Botswana.

See also
 Mosetse village
 Nwetwe Pan
 Sua Pan

References

Rivers of Botswana
Makgadikgadi Pan